Skin is the second studio album of 16volt, released on January 13, 1994 by Re-Constriction Records.

Reception

John Bush of allmusic compared the band favorably to Skinny Puppy and said that "Skin has the same sinister vocals, raucous percussion and samples as Ogilvie's band." Aiding & Abetting called Skin "a stunning display of musical and creative power" and credited the live sound and diverse compositions as being the high points of the album." Sonic Boom praised Skin for "utiliz[ing] the guitar work to accentuate the music as opposed to detracting from the electronics and overpowering them" and that "16 Volt is the only other band besides Front Line Assembly who has successfully used guitars as the primary element of percussion in some of their music." CD Review gave the album and six out of six, praising the industrial style of the guitar performances.

Track listing

Personnel
Adapted from the Skin liner notes.

16volt
 Eric Powell – lead vocals, sampler, synthesizer, programming, bass guitar, production, cover art, art direction
 Jeff Taylor – guitar, sampler, bass guitar, art direction
 Von Vinhasa – drums, percussion, programming

Addition performers
 Chris Carey – guitar

Production and design
 Keith "Fluffy" Auerbach – recording & mixing (5)
 Tony Lash – production, editing, mastering, mixing & recording (1-4, 6-10), synthesizer (9, 10), drums & percussion (8)

Release history

References

External links 
 
 Skin at Bandcamp
 

1994 albums
16volt albums
Metropolis Records albums
Off Beat (label) albums
Re-Constriction Records albums